The Co-operative Commonwealth Federation (CCF; , FCC); from 1955 the Social Democratic Party of Canada, was a federal democratic socialist and social-democratic political party in Canada. The CCF was founded in 1932 in Calgary, Alberta, by a number of socialist, agrarian, co-operative, and labour groups, and the League for Social Reconstruction. In 1944, the CCF formed the first social-democratic government in North America when it was elected to form the provincial government in Saskatchewan.

The full, but little used, name of the party was Co-operative Commonwealth Federation (Farmer-Labour-Socialist).

In 1961, the CCF was succeeded by the New Democratic Party (NDP).

History

Origins
The CCF aimed to alleviate the suffering that workers and farmers, the ill and the old endured under capitalism, seen most starkly during the Great Depression, through the creation of a Co-operative Commonwealth, which would entail economic co-operation, public ownership of the economy, and political reform.
 
The object of the political party as reported at its founding meeting in Calgary in 1932 was  "the federation [joining together] of organizations whose purpose is the establishment in Canada of a co-operative commonwealth, in which the basic principle of regulating production, distribution and exchange will be the supplying of human needs instead of the making of profit."

The goal of the CCF was defined as a "community freed from the domination of irresponsible financial and economic power in which all social means of production and distribution, including land, are socially owned and controlled either by voluntarily organized groups of producers and consumers or – in the case of major public services and utilities and such productive and distributive enterprises as can be conducted most efficiently when owned in common – by public corporations responsible to the people's elected representatives". Many of the party's first Members of Parliament (MPs) were members of the Ginger Group, composed of United Farmers of Alberta, left-wing Progressive, and Labour MPs. These MPs included United Farmers of Alberta MPs William Irvine and Ted Garland, Agnes Macphail (UFO), Humphrey Mitchell, Abraham Albert Heaps, Angus MacInnis, and Labour Party MP J. S. Woodsworth. Also involved in founding the new party were members of the League for Social Reconstruction (LSR), such as F. R. Scott and Frank Underhill. It can be said that the CCF was founded on May 26, 1932, when the Ginger Group MPs and LSR members met in William Irvine's office, the unofficial caucus meeting room for the Ginger Group, and went about forming the basis of the new party. J. S. Woodsworth was unanimously appointed the temporary leader until they could hold a founding convention. The temporary name for the new party was the Commonwealth Party. The Social Gospel was a significant influence on the CCF.

At its founding convention in 1932 in Calgary, the party settled on the name "Co-operative Commonwealth Federation (Farmer-Labour-Socialist)" and selected J. S. Woodsworth as party leader. Woodsworth had been an Independent Labour Party MP since 1921 and a member of the Ginger Group of MPs. The party's 1933 convention, held in Regina, Saskatchewan, adopted the Regina Manifesto as the party's program. The manifesto outlined a number of goals, including public ownership of key industries, universal public pensions, universal health care, children's allowances, unemployment insurance, and workers' compensation.

Its conclusion read, "No CCF Government will rest content until it has eradicated capitalism and put into operation the full programme of socialized planning which will lead to the establishment in Canada of the Co-operative Commonwealth." The party affiliated itself with the Socialist International.

Electoral performance

In line with Alberta's important role in founding the CCF, it is said that the first CCF candidate elected was Chester Ronning in the Alberta provincial constituency of Camrose, in October 1932. The UFA, under whose banner he contested the election, formalized its already-strong connection to the CCF in its next provincial convention, in January 1933.
 
In its first federal election, seven CCF MPs were elected to the House of Commons in 1935. Eight were elected in the following election in 1940, including their first member east of Manitoba, Clarence Gillis, in Cape Breton, a coal-mining area of Nova Scotia (specifically the federal riding of Cape Breton South).

The party was divided with the outbreak of World War II: Woodsworth was a pacifist, while many party members supported the Canadian war effort. Woodsworth had a physically debilitating stroke in May 1940 and could no longer perform his duties as leader. In October, Woodsworth wrote a letter to the 1940 CCF convention, in essence asking to retire from the leadership. Instead, the delegates created the new position of Honorary President, abolished the President's position and re-elected M. J. Coldwell as the National Chairman. Coldwell was then appointed acting House Leader on 6 November. Woodsworth died on 21 March 1942, and Coldwell officially became the new leader at the July convention in Toronto and threw the party behind the war effort. As a memorial to Woodsworth, Coldwell suggested that the CCF create a research foundation, and Woodsworth House was established in Toronto for that purpose.

The party won a critical York South by-election on 8 February 1942, and in the process prevented the Conservative leader, former Prime Minister Arthur Meighen, from entering the House of Commons.

In the 1945 election, 28 CCF MPs were elected, and the party won 15.6% of the vote.

In the 1949 election, 13 CCF candidates were elected. This was followed by 23 elected in the 1953 election and a disappointing eight elected in the 1958 election.

The party had its greatest success in provincial politics. In 1943, the Ontario CCF became the official opposition in that province.

In 1944 the Saskatchewan CCF formed the first democratic socialist government in North America, with Tommy Douglas as premier. Douglas introduced universal Medicare to Saskatchewan, a policy that was soon adopted by other provinces and implemented nationally by the Liberal Party of Canada during the administration of Prime Minister Lester B. Pearson. Tommy Douglas's CCF governed Saskatchewan from 1944 to 1961.

New Party
Federally, during the Cold War, the CCF was accused of having Communist leanings. The party moved to address these accusations in 1956 by replacing the Regina Manifesto with a more moderate document, the Winnipeg Declaration. Nevertheless, the party did poorly in the 1958 federal election, winning only eight seats.

After much discussion, the CCF and the Canadian Labour Congress decided to join forces to create a new political party that could make social democracy more popular with Canadian voters. This party, initially known as the New Party, became the New Democratic Party (NDP) in 1961.

Election results

Organization
The CCF estimated its membership as being slightly more than 20,000 in 1938, less than 30,000 in 1942, and over 90,000 in 1944. Membership figures declined following World War II to only 20,238 in 1950 and would never again reach 30,000

By the late 1940s the CCF had official or unofficial weekly newspapers in Alberta, British Columbia, and Saskatchewan; twice-monthly papers in Ontario and Manitoba; and a bimonthly in the Maritimes. A French-language paper in Quebec was also attempted at various times. The party also produced many educational books, pamphlets, and magazines, though these efforts declined in the 1950s.

Party leaders

National chairmen

The national chairman was the equivalent of party president in most Canadian political parties and was sometimes referred to as such, in that it was largely an organizational role. In the case of the CCF, the national chairman oversaw the party's national council and chaired its meetings. Following an initial period in which Woodsworth held both roles, it was usually distinct from and secondary to the position of party leader. National president originally was also a title the leader held, as both Woodsworth and Coldwell held the title when they held seats in the House of Commons. In 1958, after Coldwell lost his seat, the position of national chairman was merged formally into the president's title and was held by David Lewis.

 J. S. Woodsworth (1932–38)
 M. J. Coldwell (1938–42)
 F. R. Scott (1942–50)
 Percy Wright (1950–54)
 David Lewis (1954–58)
 David Lewis as party president (1958–61)

National secretaries
The national secretary was a staff position (initially part-time, and then full-time beginning 1938) which was responsible for the day-to-day organizing of the party. The national secretary was the only full-time employee at the party's national headquarters until 1943, when a research director, Eugene Forsey, and an assistant to the leader were hired.

 M. J. Coldwell (1934–36)
 David Lewis (1936–50)
 Lorne Ingle (1950–58)
 Carl Hamilton (1958–61)

CCF song

The CCF song would be later popularized by the movie Prairie Giant: The Tommy Douglas Story.

First verse:

A call goes out to Canada
It comes from out the soil—
Come and join the ranks through all the land
To fight for those who toil
Come on farmer, soldier, labourer,
From the mine and factory,
And side by side we'll swell the tide—
C.C.F. to Victory.

Provincial sections
 Alberta CCF
 British Columbia CCF
 Manitoba CCF
 New Brunswick CCF
 Newfoundland CCF/Newfoundland Democratic Party
 Nova Scotia CCF
 Ontario CCF
 Prince Edward Island CCF
 Parti social démocratique du Québec (CCF in Quebec)
 Saskatchewan CCF

See also
 List of articles about CCF/NDP members
 List of articles about British Columbia CCF/NDP members
 List of articles about Alberta CCF/NDP members
 List of articles about Saskatchewan CCF/NDP members
 List of articles about Manitoba CCF/NDP members
 List of articles about Ontario CCF/NDP members
 List of articles about Newfoundland and Labrador CCF/NDP members
 List of articles about Nova Scotia CCF/NDP members
 List of articles about Yukon NDP members
 Labour Party (Canada)
 New Democratic Party
 United Farmers
 Canadian Labour Congress
 Paper Wheat

References

Footnotes

Bibliography

External links 
 The Prairie Roots of Canada's Political 'Third Parties'
 Tommy Douglas: "Greatest Canadian" feature article from the Canadian Encyclopedia
 The Co-operative Commonwealth Federation (CCF) and the New Democratic Party (NDP): their Failure in Quebec, 1932–1997

Archives 
 Co-operative Commonwealth Federation and New Democratic Party fonds at Library and Archives Canada.
 George E. Rennar Papers. 1933–1972. 37.43 cubic feet. Contains ephemera on the Congress of Industrial Organizations from 1945 to 1947. At the Labor Archives of Washington, University of Washington Special Collections.

 
1932 establishments in Canada
1961 disestablishments in Canada
Agrarian parties in Canada
Defunct agrarian political parties
Federal political parties in Canada
Former member parties of the Socialist International
Labour history of Canada
History of the New Democratic Party (Canada)
Political history of Canada
Political parties disestablished in 1961
Political parties established in 1932
Social democratic parties in Canada